Buczek may refer to:

Buczek, Brodnica County in Kuyavian-Pomeranian Voivodeship (north-central Poland)
Buczek, Świecie County in Kuyavian-Pomeranian Voivodeship (north-central Poland)
Buczek, Brzeziny County in Łódź Voivodeship (central Poland)
Buczek, Łask County in Łódź Voivodeship (central Poland)
Buczek, Opoczno County in Łódź Voivodeship (central Poland)
Buczek, Świętokrzyskie Voivodeship (south-central Poland)
Buczek, Lubusz Voivodeship (west Poland)
Buczek, Opole Voivodeship (south-west Poland)
Buczek, Warmian-Masurian Voivodeship (north Poland)
Buczek, Białogard County in West Pomeranian Voivodeship (north-west Poland)
Buczek, Szczecinek County in West Pomeranian Voivodeship (north-west Poland)
Samantha Buczek